The following is a list of Lepidoptera present in the U.S. state of Massachusetts. There are over 200 different species of moths in the state, but due to similarities many are often mistaken for other species.

List criteria and legend
Criteria

Photography – The list below does not cite vernacular photography, all photography sourcing must be verified by and/or taken by an expert in the field. 
Range – The list below generally excludes vagrancy, Lepidoptera that are native or have been introduced to the state are preferred. Photos alone can not establish a range unless specifically stated.

Legend

Moths

Butterflies

Notes

Image notes
Hyphantria cunea – The females of this species are unspotted. 
Lymantria dispar dispar – Males of this species are brown in color.

References

External links
Massachusetts Butterfly Species List – NABA.org

Butterflies
Massachusetts